Ch'usiqani (Aymara ch'usiqa (barn) owl, -ni a suffix to indicate ownership, "the one with the owl (or owls)", also spelled Chusekani, erroneously also Chudexani) is a  mountain in the Bolivian Andes. It is located in the Chuquisaca Department, Oropeza Province, Poroma Municipality.

References 

Mountains of Chuquisaca Department